Jelani Aliyu (born September 11, 1966) is a Nigerian automotive designer who worked for the American car company General Motors. He was a senior creative designer at GM, until his appointment as the Director general of the National Automotive Design and Development Council (NADDC) in 2017 by Nigerian president Muhammadu Buhari.

Early life and education 
Aliyu was born in 1966 in Kaduna, Nigeria into the family of Alhaji Aliyu Haidar and Hajiya Sharifiyya Hauwa Aliyu, he was the fifth of the seven children in the family who were originally from Dogon-daji in Sokoto State, this was why young Aliyu was moved to Sokoto for his education. He studied at the Sokoto Capital School from 1971 to 1978 and then Federal Government College Sokoto where he received an outstanding award of the best graduating student in Technical Drawing.

In 1986, Aliyu gained admission to study Architecture at the Ahmadu Bello University Zaria. However, Aliyu quickly dropped out from the university when he found out that studying at the university would unlikely give him the opportunity to pursue his dream of becoming a car designer as studying there is not as practical as in the polytechnic and then went on to the Federal Polytechnic Birnin Kebbi in Kebbi State from 1986 to 1988 where he earned an associate degree in Architecture with an award for the Best All-Round Student. While he was there he began seeking admission into design schools in Europe and the U.S. that would lead him to a career in automotive design.

In 1990, Aliyu was sponsored by the Sokoto State Scholarship board to study in the United States at the College for Creative Studies in Detroit to study automotive design. While studying Aliyu won two prestigious awards from Ford Motor Company and Michelin, US.
In 1994, Aliyu got his qualification in automotive design and immediately joined General Motors team, where he started his design career.

Career  
In 1994 after graduating from the College for Creative Studies, Aliyu joined  General Motors. At General Motors Aliyu was the co-designer of the Oldsmobile Bravada, Buick Rendezvous and the Opel Astra and was the lead exterior designer for the Pontiac G6 and the Chevrolet Volt, a hybrid electric vehicle with a sleek arcing roofline.
When speaking about the inspiration for his automotive design career in an interview, Jelani said; He also said, his inspirations were his parents because they let him decide what he wanted to do. For example, when he went to Ahmadu Bello University in Zaria and decided he did not want to continue there, they were supportive. They did not insist that he had to remain there.

On the design of Chevrolet Volt, he said;

Notable designs 
 2004 Pontiac G6  
 2010  Chevrolet Volt

See also 
 Chuck Jordan (automobile designer)
 Strother McMinn
 Helene Rother

References

External links

1966 births
People from Sokoto
Nigerian automobile designers
General Motors designers
Opel designers
20th-century Nigerian businesspeople
Living people
College for Creative Studies alumni